Jorge Rubén Nordhausen González (born Reynosa, Mexico 20 November 1950 ) is a Mexican politician affiliated with the PAN. He served as Senator of the LVIII and LIX Legislatures of the Mexican Congress representing Campeche. He also served as Deputy of the LX Legislature.

References

1950 births
Living people
People from Reynosa
Members of the Senate of the Republic (Mexico)
Members of the Chamber of Deputies (Mexico)
National Action Party (Mexico) politicians
21st-century Mexican politicians
Politicians from Tamaulipas